Andrew Paul Lee (born August 11, 1982) is an American football punter for the Arizona Cardinals of the National Football League (NFL). He played college football at Pittsburgh, and was drafted by the San Francisco 49ers in the sixth round of the 2004 NFL Draft.

Lee has also been a member of the Cleveland Browns and Carolina Panthers.

Lee was selected to the Pro Bowl following the 2007, 2009, and 2011 seasons.

Early life
Lee was born in Westminster, South Carolina. He graduated from West-Oak High School in Westminster. At West-Oak High School, Lee was a 3-sport star athlete, lettering in football, baseball, and basketball. In football, he punted and played tight end and wide receiver as a senior. His punting average as a senior was 42.8 yards, earning him a 33rd ranking in South Carolina by SuperPrep. He was selected twice to All-Conference honors in basketball and helped lead the baseball team to a district championship and the state playoffs. As a pitcher, he went 5-0 as a junior and 8-2 as a senior, with a selection to the North-South Baseball All-Star Game and a Golden and Silver Arm Award.

College career
Lee attended the University of Pittsburgh and played for the Pittsburgh Panthers football team from 2000 to 2003. He was Pittsburgh's starting punter for three seasons after winning the starting role late in true freshman season (2000). His 244 punts and 10,353 yards are tops in school history. Also had 29 fair catches, 61 kicks downed inside 20-yard line and three blocked kicks. He was the only player to ever win Big East Conference Special Teams Player of the Year honors twice in career. His senior year in college, Lee was a semi-finalist for the Ray Guy Award, given to  college football's top punter. Lee was the All-Big East Conference first-team choice and Co-Special Teams Player of the Year.

Professional career

NFL Draft

Following a successful collegiate career, Lee was drafted in the sixth round of the NFL Draft with the 188th overall pick by the San Francisco 49ers. He is the sole active player drafted in the 2004 NFL draft. Lee had never attended an NFL game growing up in South Carolina. Even when he went on to become a standout punter on the collegiate level at the University of Pittsburgh, he was still a stranger to live NFL action.

San Francisco 49ers

2004 season
In Lee's rookie season, he punted 96 times with 25 dropped inside the 20 and an NFL-long of 81 yards.
His punting average of 41.6 yards per punt was first time a 49ers punter averaged over 40 yards per punt since Reggie Roby in 1998. Lee also posted seven punts for 338 yards (48.3 avg.), including career-long of 81 yards with one punt downed inside 20-yard line at Tampa Bay (11-21). His 81-yarder was fourth-longest in 49ers history and NFL's longest punt of the year.

2005 season
In 2005, Lee set a career-high with 107 punts (41.6 avg.), including 15 punts downed inside the 20. His three touchbacks in 107 punts was third-best ratio of touchbacks-to-punts among punters with 30 or more kicks in 2005, trailing Houston’s  Chad Stanley (one touchback in 70 punts) and Detroit's Nick Harris (two touchbacks in 84 punts). His ratio of touchbacks-to-punts is best for any 49ers punter since 1970, topping Joe Prokop (one touchback in 40 punts) in 1991.

2006 season
In 2006, Lee registered 81 punts (44.8 avg.) with 22 punts dropped inside the 20-yard line and a net average of 36.8. He finished seventh in NFL with 36.8 net yards, while his 44.8 gross average marked team’s highest since Tommy Davis averaged 45.6 in 1964. Lee was awarded game ball for his efforts in the 20-14 victory vs. Seattle (11-19) when he landed two punts inside the 20-yard line to help the 49ers win the battle of field position. He also grossed 51.5 yards per punt at St. Louis (11-26), which included a season-long of 66 yards.

2007 season
Lee earned Pro Bowl and All-Pro honors in 2007 after setting numerous records on 105 punts (47.3 avg.) with a net average of 41.0 and NFL record 42 punts downed inside opponents’ 20-yard line. His yardage, gross average, net average and punts downed inside 20-yard line all set team records. His 4,968 punting yards in 2007 are an NFL single season record. His 42 punts downed inside 20-yard line broke Baltimore's Kyle Richardson's NFL mark of 39 in 1999. His 41.0 net average ranks second all-time in NFL history, trailing only Shane Lechler of Oakland (41.1 in 2007). He ranked second in NFL for gross average (47.3) and net punting average (41.0) to Oakland's Lechler. Also led the NFL with 49 punts over 50+ yards, which was 16 more than second ranked St. Louis’ Donnie Jones (33). Recorded four games in which he dropped four punts inside 20-yard line. Lee played key role in 49ers 37–31 overtime victory at Arizona (11-25), booming a 58-yard punt in overtime that wound up pinning Cardinals on their own three-yard line. The punt helped set up 49ers winning touchdown on DT Ronald Fields sack and forced fumble in the end zone that was recovered by linebacker Tully Banta-Cain for game-winning score.

2008 season

After earning Pro Bowl and All-Pro honors in 2007, Lee once again put up outstanding numbers, in 2008, as he set a career-high and team record with his 47.8 gross average. He had a career long 82-yard punt against the New England Patriots on October 5.

2009 season
In the 2009 season, Lee returned to his 2007 form, having a superb year and earning his second Pro Bowl selection.

2010 season
Lee followed up his Pro Bowl season in 2009 with another stellar year for the 49ers, playing in all 16 games and averaging 46.2 yards per punt. The 2010 season also marked the first season a punter ran for more than 70 yards in a single game, as he completed 2 successful fake punt run attempts.

2011 season
In 2011, Lee set a new NFL single-season record by averaging 44.0 net yards per punt, while his gross average of 50.9 yards was third best in league history. He was named First-team All-Pro by the Associated Press and was voted to his third Pro Bowl, in which he completed a pass on a fake punt to the Cardinals' Patrick Peterson for a first down.

2012 season
On May 25, 2012, he received a six-year $20.4 million contract extension with the 49ers that made him the third highest-paid punter in the league.

At the end of the 2012 season, Lee and the 49ers appeared in Super Bowl XLVII. In the game, he had three punts for 159 net yards (55.0 average) as the 49ers fell to the Baltimore Ravens by a score of 34–31.

Cleveland Browns
On June 6, 2015, Lee was traded to Cleveland Browns for a seventh-round pick in the 2017 NFL Draft. This took place after the 49ers drafted punter Bradley Pinion. He announced he would wear #8 for the team in honor of his daughter Madelyn, who died in February 2015 at just eight days old.

Carolina Panthers
On August 29, 2016, Lee was traded from the Browns to the Carolina Panthers along with a 2017 seventh round pick for a 2018 fourth round pick and punter Kasey Redfern. Lee was placed on injured reserve on November 14, 2016, after pulling his hamstring.

On September 2, 2017, Lee was released by the Panthers.

Arizona Cardinals
On September 4, 2017, the Arizona Cardinals signed Lee to a two-year deal.

On June 14, 2018, Lee signed a two-year contract extension with the Cardinals through the 2020 season. In the 2018 season, Lee led with the league with 94 punts for 4,568 net yards for a 48.60 average.

In Week 10 of the 2019 season, against the Tampa Bay Buccaneers, Lee converted on a 25-yard pass to Pharoh Cooper on a fake punt.

On December 20, 2020, in Week 15, against the Philadelphia Eagles, Lee converted on a 26-yard pass to linebacker Ezekiel Turner on a fake punt.

Lee re-signed to a one-year contract with the Cardinals on March 22, 2021. He signed another one-year contract on March 17, 2022.

NFL career statistics

NFL records
 Highest net yards punting average in a single season: 44.0 in the 2011 NFL season (This record was broken by Johnny Hekker during the 2013 NFL season with a 44.2 yards net average)

49ers franchise records
 Most career punting yards (43,468)
 Most punting yards in a single season: 4,968 (2007)

References

External links

Cleveland Browns biography
San Francisco 49ers biography
Pro-Football-Reference.com

1982 births
Living people
American football punters
National Conference Pro Bowl players
People from Westminster, South Carolina
Pittsburgh Panthers football players
Players of American football from South Carolina
San Francisco 49ers players
Cleveland Browns players
Carolina Panthers players
Arizona Cardinals players